Admiral Kuznetsov may refer to:

 Nikolay Kuznetsov (officer) (1904–1974), former Commander-in-Chief of the Soviet Navy
 Russian aircraft carrier Admiral Kuznetsov

See also
 Kuznetsov-class aircraft carriers, named after the Admiral Kuznetsov
 Admiral Kuznetsov Strait, Bering Sea